A liftback is a variation of hatchback with a sloping roofline between 45 and 5 degrees. Traditional hatchback designs usually have a 90 to 46 degree slope on the tailgate or rear door. As such the liftback is essentially a hatchback with a more sloping roof, similar to sedans/saloons from a styling perspective. Some liftbacks may also have an appearance similar to a coupe but with a tailgate hinged at the roof that is lifted to open.

The liftback design combines the versatility of a regular hatchback and aerodynamics of a sedan. Liftbacks often offer more boot space over the regular hatchback and sedan but not the station wagon/estate variant of the same model.



History 

In 1973, Toyota invented the liftback term to describe the sloping roofline variation of the Celica with a tailgate hinged at the roof, as opposed to the regular hardtop coupe variation which was introduced three years earlier. As its roofline slope is uninterrupted, it can also be defined as a fastback-styled hatchback.

Liftback versus fastback 

The term fastback is not interchangeable with liftback. A liftback is defined as having a tailgate that is hinged from the roof, similarly to a hatchback, whereas a fastback is a broad styling term used to describe any car with an uninterrupted slope in the roofline from the roof to the rear bumper. Thus, although some liftbacks are fastbacks, not all liftbacks are necessarily fastbacks. Additionally, some fastbacks have a tailgate hinged below a fixed rear window, which is not characteristic of a liftback. 

Some feel the slope of the rear window is a key determinant in the term liftback, in which the rear cargo door, or hatch, is horizontally angled. As a result, the hatch is lifted more upwards than backwards to open, a lifting action.

Europe 

Liftbacks were the mainstay of manufacturers' D-segment offerings in Europe in the 1990s to late 2000s, having become popular in the 1980s.  It was common for manufacturers to offer the same D-segment model in three different body styles: a 4-door sedan, a 5-door liftback, and a 5-door station wagon. Such models included the Ford Mondeo, the Mazda 626 and 6, the Nissan Primera, the Opel Vectra and Insignia, and the Toyota Carina and Avensis. There were also models in this market segment available only as a 5-door liftback or a 4-door sedan, and models available only as a 5-door liftback or a 5-door station wagon. Often, the liftback and the sedan shared the same wheelbase and the same overall length, and the full rear overhang length of a conventional sedan trunk was retained on the five-door liftback version of the car.

The term was sometimes used for marketing purposes, among others, by Toyota, for example, to distinguish between two 5-door versions of the E90 series Corolla sold in Europe, one of which was a conventional 5-door hatchback with a nearly vertical rear hatch while the other one was a 5-door liftback.

Audi, BMW and Mercedes-Benz were not part of this trend in the 1990s, as they did not offer their D-segment or executive cars as 5-door liftbacks back then. However, starting around 2009, Audi and BMW started to sell liftback versions of some of their vehicles but with their own marketing terms, referring to them as Sportback (Audi) or Gran Turismo/Gran Coupé (BMW). This occurred not long after some other manufacturers started to retire D-segment liftbacks from their European lineup.

The second-generation Škoda Superb, produced from 2008 until 2015, is a car that functions both as a hatchback and a sedan. It features a Twindoor trunk lid that can be opened using hinges located below the rear glass, or together with the rear glass using hinges at the roof.

See also 
 Car classification

References 

 
Car body styles
Car classifications